Donja Bioča may refer to:
 Donja Bioča (Hadžići), a village in Hadžići, Bosnia and Herzegovina
 Donja Bioča (Ilijaš), a village in Ilijaš, Bosnia and Herzegovina